The attorney general of Delaware is a constitutional officer of the U.S. state of Delaware, and is the chief law officer and the head of the State Department of Justice. On January 1, 2019, Kathy Jennings was sworn in as the 46th attorney general of Delaware.

Description of the office
The attorney general elected to a four-year term in the "off-year" state election, two years before/after the election of the governor. Along with the state treasurer, state auditor, and state insurance commissioner, the office is intended to serve as a restraint to the governor's exclusive executive authority. The office existed in various forms prior to the ratification of the Delaware Constitution of 1776, which continued the existing colonial tradition of granting the governor the power to appoint the attorney general for a five-year tenure. With the ratification of the Delaware Constitution of 1897, the post was converted to its present four-year elected form, also establishing the attorney general as third in line of succession to the office of governor, after the lieutenant governor and secretary of state.

Officeholders
Gunning Bedford Jr. was the first holder of the office after American independence. The office was held from 2007-2015 by Beau Biden, who was elected in 2006 and took office on January 2, 2007. He was a Democrat and the eldest son of the current U.S. President and the longest serving U.S. Senator from Delaware Joe Biden. The current interim is Dennis Greenhouse.

See also
 State attorney general

Sources

References

External links
 Delaware Attorney General official website
 Delaware Attorney General articles at ABA Journal
 News and Commentary at FindLaw
 Delaware Code at Law.Justia.com
 U.S. Supreme Court Opinions - "Cases with title containing: State of Delaware" at FindLaw
 Delaware State Bar Association
 Delaware Attorney General Matthew Denn profile at National Association of Attorneys General
 Press releases at State of Delaware news (news.delaware.gov)